Progress Theatre is a local theatre company at Reading in England. It is a registered charity and it is a member of the Little Theatre Guild (LTG) and the National Operatic and Dramatic Association (NODA).

History
Progress Theatre was established in 1946 with the aim of presenting new and challenging work.

Its first production was staged in 1947 in Palmer Hall, West Street, Reading. It moved to its present location, The Mildmay Hall, The Mount (near Reading University) in 1951.

In 1964, after a fund raising campaign, the freehold of the building was bought. After modernisation, the theatre now seats 97 people.

Kenneth Branagh, who was a member of the theatre in the late 1970s became Progress Theatre patron in 2011.

Educational role
In the 1950s a Student Group for 14- to 18-year-olds was set up. A charitable organisation, "The Progress Theatre" was established in 1962 with the object of promoting education in performing arts in Reading and the surrounding area.  Since 2009, the Progress Youth Theatre consists of two groups for 15- to 18-year-olds and groups for school years 4 to 6 (ages 8 to 11), 7 to 8 (ages 11 to 13) and 9 to 10 (ages 13 to 15). The groups give a public performance each year.

Present day
The theatre has a membership of around 150 people and puts on a regular menu of classic and contemporary theatre. All of these productions are managed by volunteers.

The theatre also stages a summer open-air event, predominantly a Shakespeare play, at the historic and newly-revovated ruins of Reading Abbey. These productions are managed in partnership with Reading Borough Council. In 2007, the event was expanded to form the Reading Abbey Ruins Open Air Festival. Due to the ongoing restoration of the abbey, in 2011 the event temporarily moved to the gardens of Caversham Court, the site of a Tudor manor house on the banks of the River Thames. However, it returned to Reading Abbey Ruins in 2018, following the completion of the renovations, and continued to perform from this beautiful location.

Past productions
Progress has presented contemporary plays since its founding and the first performances in England of The Good Woman of Setzuan by Bertolt Brecht and The Shadow of a Gunman by Seán O'Casey were produced at the theatre in 1952 and 1958 respectively.

More recently, Progress has produced a series of Christmas shows based on popular children's books including:
Mort by Terry Pratchett (adap. Stephen Briggs) in 1997–1998
James and the Giant Peach by Roald Dahl in 2005–2006, using an adaptation by David Wood usually available only to professional productions.

Recent years have also seen productions of notorious plays such as Blasted by Sarah Kane while the yearly open-air Shakespeare season continues to prove popular.

Past seasons

Famous members
Sir Kenneth Branagh made his earliest theatre appearances with Progress Theatre in the 1970s, including one minor role as "second policeman" and is the theatre's patron.
Dame Judi Dench is currently the patron of the Friends of Progress Theatre.
Marianne Faithfull, a pop singer and actress, was a member of the Theatre's Student Group in the early 1960s.
Gerard Johnson, a British keyboard player, was also a member of the Theatre's Student Group between 1976 and 1981.
Peter Strickland, director and screenwriter of Berberian Sound Studio.
Elize du Toit, an actress who has appeared in Hollyoaks and Skyfall.
Brendan Patricks, a London based magician and actor from Downton Abbey.

Notes
A. My Voice(s), a piece of new writing featured in the First Write Fest, was subsequently developed and performed at the 2007 Edinburgh Festival Fringe.

References

External links
 Progress Theatre website

Arts organizations established in 1946
Amateur theatre companies in England
Organisations based in Berkshire
Culture in Reading, Berkshire
Theatres in Berkshire
Buildings and structures in Reading, Berkshire
Charities based in Berkshire
Community theatre
Little_Theatre_Guild_of_Great_Britain